Bob Stagner (born July 13, 1957 in Chattanooga, Tennessee) is an American drummer and percussionist who has worked with a wide range of artists in every discipline, from Blueground Undergrass to Derek Bailey and Howard Finster.
Stagner and Dennis Palmer co-founded the free improvisation duo the Shaking Ray Levis and the Shaking Ray Levi Society, an arts education organization that supports emerging artists in performance, art and film. Stagner also works with The Rhythmic Arts Project, founded by drummer Eddie Tuduri. He is not only a musician but also a very talented drum teacher.

Selected discography and credits
Boss Witch, Dennis Palmer, Bob Stagner, J.D. Parran, Steve Beresford, Davey Williams, Frank Pahl, Mary Richards; Shaking Ray Records, 1992
False Prophets or Dang Good Guessers; Shaking Ray Levis (Stagner, Palmer); Incus Records, 1992
Live at Lamar's, Derek Bailey, Dennis Palmer, Bob Stagner; Shaking Ray Records, 1999
Mayor of the Tennessee River David Greenberger, Frank Pahl, Kenny Palmer, Dennis Palmer, Bob Stagner; PelPel Recordings, 2003
He Who is Blessed, Bob Stagner, executive producer, Tutto Buono, 2005
A.S.A.P. Wings, Killick Erik Hinds, Dennis Palmer, Bob Stagner; Shaking Ray Records, 2007

External links
Bio
[ Allmusic.com Bio]
"Mind on Heaven" Shaking Ray Levis (Palmer, Stagner) and Howard Finster, 1997
Blood on the pulpit sample (requires free registration), The Mayor of the Tennessee River, 2003
Heard Out, review of Derek Bailey, Dennis Palmer and Bob Stagner at Tonic, April 12, 2003 
End credits, Dennis Palmer & Bob Stagner - from the soundtrack to Anti-Arktikos - an animated film by Judith Mogul, 2006
Southern improv at its finest, review, Creative Loafing (Atlanta), May 2006
Rhythmic arts project provides methods of healing, article, Chattanooga Times Free Press, October 12, 2006
The Memphis Indie Film Festival: Best in Show?, review, Memphis Commercial Appeal, October 11, 2006
Insects & Bacon Legs sample, A.S.A.P. Wings, Shaking Ray Levis (Hinds, Palmer, Stagner)

Bob Stagner
Living people
1957 births
20th-century American drummers
American male drummers
20th-century American male musicians
Incus Records artists